David R. Mayer (born February 28, 1967) is an American Democratic Party politician and the current mayor of Gloucester Township, New Jersey. https://sign.moveon.org/petitions/recall-mayor-mayer-and

Mayer served in the New Jersey General Assembly from 2004 to 2008, where he represented the 4th Legislative District. He was a member of the General Assembly's Education Committee, Transportation and Public Works Committee, and the Intergovernmental Relations Commission.

Mayer served in the Camden County Clerk's Office from 1995 to 2003 as Chief of Staff. He was a member of the Gloucester Township Council from 2002 to 2003. From 1990 to 1995 he was the district director of U.S. Representative Robert Andrews’s District Office for the New Jersey's First Congressional District. Mayer taught courses in political science at Rowan University and in public administration at Rutgers University-Camden. https://sign.moveon.org/petitions/recall-mayor-mayer-and https://sign.moveon.org/petitions/recall-mayor-mayer-and

Biography
Mayer graduated from Rutgers University–Camden with a B.A. in Psychology and a M.P.A. in Public Policy. He was awarded a J.D. degree from Rutgers School of Law–Camden. He is a resident of the Blackwood section of Gloucester Township.

Mayer was elected mayor of Gloucester Township, New Jersey and took office on January 2, 2010. In 2015, he married Camden County Freeholder Michelle Gentek-Mayer.

Mayor Mayer is an adjunct professor at Rowan University, teaching courses on public administration, public policy, and political science.

District 4
Each of the forty districts in the New Jersey Legislature has one representative in the New Jersey Senate and two members in the New Jersey General Assembly. The other representatives from the 4th Legislative District for the 2006-2007 session were:
Assemblyman Paul D. Moriarty, and
Senator Fred H. Madden

References

External links
Assemblyman Mayer's Legislative Website, New Jersey Legislature, backed up by the Internet Archive as of December 23, 2007.
Madden, Mayer and Moriarty legislative website
Assembly Member David R. Mayer, Project Vote Smart
New Jersey Voter Information Website 2003
New Jersey Legislature financial disclosure form for 2006 (PDF)
New Jersey Legislature financial disclosure form for 2005 (PDF)
New Jersey Legislature financial disclosure form for 2004 (PDF)

1967 births
Living people
Mayors of places in New Jersey
New Jersey city council members
Democratic Party members of the New Jersey General Assembly
New Jersey lawyers
People from Gloucester Township, New Jersey
Politicians from Camden County, New Jersey
Rutgers School of Law–Camden alumni
Rutgers University–Camden alumni
Rutgers University faculty
Rowan University faculty
21st-century American politicians